During the period between 1927 to 1949 in the Republican era amid the Chinese Civil War against the Nationalist government, the Soviet-backed Chinese Communist Party (CCP) had established a number of sphere of influence zones, collectively known as Revolutionary Base Areas, which included the terms Soviet Zone from 1927 to 1937 during the First Chinese Civil War and the Anti-Japanese Base Areas during the Second Sino-Japanese War. After the outbreak of the Second Chinese Civil War, the term Liberated Zone was used from 1946 until the founding of the People's Republic of China in 1949.

There were six soviet areas from 1927 to 1933: the Jinggang Mountains, the Central Soviet in Eastern Jiangxi on the border of Fujian, the Eyouwan (Hubei-Henan-Anhui) Soviet, Xiangexi (West Hubei and Hunan), and Xianggan (Hunan-Jiangxi). The first soviet was the Hailufeng Soviet created in 1927. The Central Soviet was the main base of the CCP where its leader Mao Zedong issued a directive on 1 September 1931 for the Central Soviet to mass mobilize the region as a base area. As problems occurred over being able to control territories outside the Central Soviet, by 1933 a full transfer of Communist forces to the Central Soviet was achieved. In 1931, the disconnected areas controlled by the Communists were declared the Chinese Soviet Republic.

Somewhat separately from the Chinese Soviets, there was a pro-Soviet Union protectorate ruled by Sheng Shicai following the Soviet invasion of Xinjiang. Sheng switched between alliance and hostility to the communists in the east.

Upon the intervention of the Soviet Union against Japan in World War II in 1945, USSR forces invaded the Japanese client state of Manchukuo. Mao Zedong in April and May 1945 had planned to mobilize 150,000 to 250,000 soldiers from across China to work with forces of the Soviet Union in capturing Manchuria. After the end of the war, the communists controlled one-third of the territory of China. From 1945 to 1949, in the Chinese Communist Revolution, the Communists captured all Chinese territory except for Taiwan and the fragments of Fujian, and established the People's Republic of China that exists today.

Jurisdiction
The CCP Soviets revised marriage law in their territories, issued laws to control the activities of counter-revolutionaries, and established a soviet-style judicial system. The judicial system was considered impressive even by opponents of the Communists, such as General Ch'en Ch'eng, who spoke of its "scarcity of cases of embezzlement and corruption".

History

On 7 November 1931, the anniversary of the 1917 Russian Bolshevik Revolution, with the help of the Soviet Union, a National Soviet People's Delegates Conference took place in Ruijin, Jiangxi province, which was selected as the national capital. The "Chinese Soviet Republic" was born, even though the majority of China was still under the control of the national Government of the Republic of China. On that day, they had an open ceremony for the new country, and Mao Zedong and other communists attended the military parade. Because it had its own bank, printed its own money and collected tax through its own tax bureau, it is considered as the beginning of Two Chinas.

With Mao Zedong as both head of state ("Chairman of the Central Executive Committee") and head of government ("Chairman of the Council of People's Commissars"), the Jiangxi Soviet gradually expanded, reaching a peak of more than 30,000 square kilometres and a population that numbered more than three million, covering considerable parts of two provinces (with Tingzhou in Fujian). Furthermore, its economy was doing better than most areas that were under the control of the Chinese warlords. In addition to the militia and guerilla, its regular Chinese Red Army alone already numbered more than 140,000 by the early 1930s, and they were better armed than most Chinese warlords' armies at the time. For example, not only did the Chinese Red Army already have modern communication means such as telephones, telegraphs and radios which most Chinese warlords' armies still lacked, it was already regularly transmitting wireless messages in codes and breaking nationalist codes. Only Chiang Kai-shek's army could match this formidable communist force.

The Nationalist government, led by Chiang Kai-shek, felt threatened by the Soviet republic and led other Chinese warlords to have the National Revolutionary Army besiege the Soviet Republic repeatedly, launching what Chiang and his fellow nationalists called encirclement campaigns at the time, while the communists called their counterattacks "counter encirclement campaigns".  Chiang Kai-shek's first, second and third encirclement campaigns were defeated by the Chinese Red Army led by Mao. However, after the third counter encirclement campaign, Mao was removed from the leadership and replaced by the Chinese communists returning from the Soviet Union such as Wang Ming, and the command of the Chinese Red Army was handled by a three-man committee that included Wang Ming's associates Otto Braun, the Comintern military advisor, Bo Gu, and Zhou Enlai. The Jiangxi Soviet thus began its inevitable rapid downfall under their policy of extreme leftism and incompetent military command, though the new leadership could not immediately rid itself of Mao's influence which prevailed during the fourth encirclement campaign, and thus saved the communists temporarily. However, as a result of the complete dominance the new communist leadership achieved after the fourth counter encirclement campaign, the Red Army was nearly halved, with most its equipment lost during Chiang's fifth encirclement campaign, started in 1933 and orchestrated by his German advisors, that involved the systematic encirclement of the Jiangxi Soviet region with fortified blockhouses. This method proved to be very effective. In an effort to break the blockade, the Red Army under the orders of the three man committee besieged the forts many times but suffered heavy casualties with little success, resulting in the Jiangxi Soviet shrinking significantly in size due to the Chinese Red Army's disastrous manpower and material losses.

On 10 October 1934, the three-man committee communist leadership formally issued the order of the general retreat, and on 16 October 1934, the Chinese Red Army begun what was later known as the Long March, fully abandoning the Jiangxi Soviet. 17 days after the main communist force had already left its base, the nationalists were finally aware that the enemy had escaped after reaching the empty city of Ruijin on 5 November 1934.  Contrary to the common erroneous belief, the original destination was He Long's communist base in Hubei, and the final destination Yan'an was not decided on until much later during the Long March, well after the rise of Mao Zedong. To avoid panic, the goal was kept a secret from most people, including Mao Zedong, and the public was told that only a portion of the Chinese Red Army would be engaged in mobile warfare to defeat nationalist forces, and thus this part of the army would be renamed as the “Field Army”.

By the fall of 1934, the communists faced total annihilation. This situation had already convinced Mao Zedong and his supporters to believe that the communists should abandon their bases in the Jiangxi Soviet republic.  However, the communist leadership stubbornly refused to accept the inevitable failure and still daydreamed of defeating the victorious nationalist forces. The three man committee devised a plan of diversions, and then a regroup after a temporary retreat. Once the regroup was complete, a counterattack would be launched in conjunction with the earlier diversion forces, driving the enemy out of the Jiangxi Soviet.

The first movements of the retreating diversion were undertaken by Fang Zhimin. Fang Zhimin and his deputy, Xun Weizhou, were first to break through Kuomintang lines in June, followed by Xiao Ke in August. These movements surprised the Kuomintang, who were numerically superior to the communists at the time and did not expect an attack on their fortified perimeter. However, things did not turn out as the communists had hoped: Fang Zhimin's force was crushed after its initial success, and with Xun Weizhou killed in action, nearly every commander in this force was wounded and captured alive, including Fang Zhimin himself, and all were executed later by the nationalists.  The only exception was Su Yu, who managed to escape.  Xiao Ke fared no better: although his force initially managed to break through and then reached He Long's communist base in Hubei, but even with their combined forces, they were unable to challenge the far superior nationalist force besieging the Jiangxi Soviet, never to return until the establishment of the People's Republic of China 15 years later.

Economy
To raise funds, the CCP fostered and taxed opium production and dealing, selling to Japanese-occupied and KMT-controlled provinces.

Bank and currency
On 1 February 1932, the National Bank of the Chinese Soviet Republic was established with Mao Zemin, the brother of Mao Zedong, as its president. The CSR Central Mint issued three kinds of currency, including the paper bill, the copper coin, and the silver dollar.

Banknotes

The Central Mint briefly issued both the paper bills and copper coins, but neither circulated for long, primarily because the currency could not be used in the rest of China.

The paper bill had "Chinese Soviet Republic" printed on the bill in traditional Chinese characters, with a picture of Vladimir Lenin.

Copper coin
Like the paper bill, the copper coins issued by the Central Mint also had "Chinese Soviet Republic" in traditional Chinese characters engraved, and due to the fact that coins last longer than paper bills, these coins were issued and circulated in much greater numbers.  However, these coins are currently rarer than the paper bill, mainly because the copper used was in need of cartridges, so these copper coins were recalled and replaced by silver dollars.

Silver dollar
The largest and most predominant currency produced by the Central Mint was the silver dollar.  Unlike the paper bills and the copper coins, the silver dollars had no Communist symbols and instead, they were the direct copy of other silver dollars produced by other mints in China, including the most popular Chinese silver dollar with Yuan Shikai's head engraved, and the eagle silver dollar of the Mexican peso.  This and the fact that the coin was made of the precious metal silver, enabled them to be circulated in the rest of China and thus was the trade currency of choice.

When the Chinese Red Army's First Front began their Long March in October 1934, the Communist bank was part of the retreating force, with 14 bank employees, over a hundred coolies and a company of soldiers escorting them while they carried all of the money and mint machinery.  One of the important tasks of the bank during the Long March whenever the Chinese Red Army stayed in a place for longer than a day was to tell the local population to exchange any Communist paper bills and copper coins to goods and currency used in nationalist controlled regions, so that the local population would not be persecuted by the pursuing nationalists after the Communists had left.  After the Zunyi Conference, it was decided that carrying the entire bank on the march was not practical, so on 29 January 1935, at Earth Town (Tucheng), the bank employees burned all Communist paper bills and mint machinery under order.  By the time the Long March had concluded in October 1935, only 8 out of the 14 original employees survived; the other 6 had died along the way.

Military

Intelligence
The CCP seemed to have been doomed under the crushing blows of the Nationalists. However, Zhou Enlai had previously achieved a brilliant intelligence success by planting more than a dozen moles in Chiang Kai-shek's inner circle, including at the general headquarters for the nationalist forces at Nanchang.  Surprisingly, the most important of the agents, Mo Xiong, was actually never a communist, but his contribution eventually saved the CCP and the Chinese Red Army.

Under the recommendation of Chiang Kai-shek's secretary-general Yang Yongtai, who was unaware of Mo's communist activities, Mo Xiong steadily excelled in Chiang Kai-shek's regime, eventually becoming an important member within Chiang Kai-shek's general headquarters in the early 1930s. In January 1934, Chiang Kai-shek named him as the administrator and commander-in-chief of the Fourth Special District in northern Jiangxi.  Mo used his position to plant more than a dozen communist agents within Chiang's general headquarters, including Liu Yafo,the communist who first introduced to the CCP, Xiang Yunian his communist handler, whom he hired as his secretary, and Lu Zhiying, the communist agent who was the acting head of the spy ring, which was directly under the command of Zhou Enlai.

After successfully besieging the adjacent regions of Ruijin, the capital of the Jiangxi Soviet, and occupying most of Jiangxi Soviet itself, Chiang was confident that he would finish off the communists in a final decisive strike. In late September 1934, Chiang distributed his top secret plan named "Iron Bucket Plan" to everyone in his general headquarter at Lushan (the alternative summer site to Nanchang), which detailed the final push to totally annihilate the communist forces. The plan was to build 30 blockade lines supported by 30 barbed wire fences, most of them electric, in the region 150 km around Ruijin, to starve the communists.  In addition, more than 1,000 trucks were to be mobilized to form a rapid reaction force in order to prevent any communist breakout. Realizing the certain annihilation of the communists, Mo Xiong (莫雄) handed the document weighing several kilograms to his communist handler Xiang Yunian the same night he received it, risking not only his own life, but that of his entire family.

With the help of Liu Yafo and Lu Zhiying, the communist agents copied the important intelligence onto four dictionaries and Xiang Yunian was tasked to take the intelligence personally to the Jiangxi Soviet.  The trip was hazardous, as the nationalist force would arrest and even execute anyone who attempted to cross the blockade.  Xiang Yunian was forced to hide in the mountains for a while, and then used rocks to knock out 4 of his own teeth, resulting in swollen face.  Disguised as a beggar, he tore off the covers of the four dictionaries and hid them at the bottom of his bag with rotten food, then successfully crossed several lines of the blockade and reached Ruijin on 7 October 1934. The valuable intelligence provided by Mo Xiong finally convinced the communists in Jiangxi Soviet to abandon its base and started a general retreat before Chiang could complete the building of his blockade lines with supporting barbed wire fences, and mobilizing trucks and troops, thus saving themselves from total annihilation.

The main retreating force in the Long March

The portion of the First Front Red Army engaged in the so-called mobile warfare was actually the bulk of the communist force making a general retreat, but this force was only much diminished from its peak of more than 140,000 men army.  With most of its equipment lost, many of the surviving members of the Chinese Red Army were forced to arm themselves with ancient weaponry.  According to the Statistical Chart of the Field Army Personnel, Weaponry, Ammunition, and Supply completed by the Chinese Red Army on 8 October 1934, two days before the Long March begun, the Communist Long March force consisted of:

Combat formations
5 combat corps totaling 72,313 combatants:
The 1st Corps (The largest of the five, with 19,880 combatants)
The 3rd Corps
The 5th Corps
The 8th Corps (the newest and smallest of the five, with 10,922 combatants)
The 9th Corps
2 columns
Central Committee 1st Column
Central Committee 2nd Column
The 5 corps and the 2 columns had a total of 86,859 combatants.

Weaponry
The Statistical Chart of Field Army Personnel, Weaponry, Ammunition, and Supply (currently kept at the People's Liberation Army Archives) also provided the weaponry and provisions prepared for the Long March, and the weapons deployed included:

Artillery: 39 total
Mortar: 38
Mountain gun: 1 (originally not included, but was added later on)
Breech-loading firearms: 33,244 total (with 1,858,156 rounds of munition), and of these, a total of 29,016 were distributed to the 5 corps, including:
Rifles: 25,317
Heavy machine guns: 333
Light machine guns: 285
Submachine guns: 28
Handguns: 2,804
Other weapons included:
Lance: 6,101
Chinese saber: 882
Various weapons were also deployed but their numbers were not counted, and these included:
Muzzle-loading rifled muskets and smoothbore muskets
Flintlock and snaphance guns
Matchlock and wheellock guns
Spears and rakes (though later during the Long March, spears were most useful as canes)
Axes and poles (though later during the Long March, poles were most useful as building material such as that for stretchers)
daggers and knives
 Provision
 Winter clothing: 83,100 sets
 Horses: 338
 Herbal medicine: 35,700 kg
 Salt: 17,413 kg
 Money: 1.642 million dollars of the Soviet Republic.

Flag gallery

References 

1927 establishments in China
Chinese Soviet Republic
Chinese Civil War
Second Sino-Japanese War
Former countries in Chinese history
States and territories established in 1927
Former socialist republics
States and territories disestablished in 1949